Waking the Witch is the eleventh novel in Women of the Otherworld series by Kelley Armstrong. .

Summary
The orphaned daughter of a sorcerer and a half-demon, Savannah is a terrifyingly powerful young witch who has never been able to resist the chance to throw her magical weight around. But at 21 she knows she needs to grow up and prove to her guardians, Paige and Lucas, that she can be a responsible member of their supernatural detective agency. So she jumps at the chance to fly solo, investigating the mysterious deaths of three young women in a nearby factory town as a favour to one of the agency's associates. At first glance, the murders look garden-variety human, but on closer inspection signs point to otherworldly stakes.

Soon Savannah is in over her head. She's run off the road and nearly killed, haunted by a mystery stalker, and freaked out when the brother of one of the dead women is murdered when he tries to investigate the crime. To complicate things, something weird is happening to her powers. Pitted against shamans, demons, a voodoo-inflected cult and garden-variety goons, Savannah has to fight to ensure her first case isn't her last. And she also has to ask for help, perhaps the hardest lesson she's ever had to learn.

Characters

Main Characters
 Savannah Levine - witch, ward of Paige Winterbourne and Lucas Cortez
 Adam Vasic - Exustio half-demon, member of the Interracial Council.

Other Characters
 Jesse Aanes
 Michael Kennedy
 Paige Winterbourne
 Leah O'Donnell
 Eve Levine

References

External links
 Official Kelley Armstrong website

Novels by Kelley Armstrong
2010 Canadian novels
Novels about orphans